Kostyantyn Ivanovich Gryshchenko (also spelled Hryshchenko; Ukrainian: Костянтин Іванович Грищенко; Russian: Константин Иванович Грищенко; born 28 October 1953) is a Ukrainian diplomat and politician. 

Since Ukraine gained independence, Kostyantyn Gryshchenko has served in a succession of senior positions with responsibilities ranging from arms control and regional security to education and public health.  He served as Vice Prime Minister of Ukraine (2012–2014), Minister of Foreign Affairs of Ukraine (2003–2005 and 2010–2012) and First Deputy Secretary of the National Security and Defense Council of Ukraine (2008–2010).
Ambassadorial appointments include: Head of Mission of Ukraine to NATO and the Ambassador of Ukraine to Belgium, the Netherlands and Luxembourg (1998–2000), Ambassador to the United States (2000–2003) and Ambassador to the Russian Federation (2008–2010). 
In addition to his posts in the Ukrainian Government, Kostyantyn Gryshchenko participated in personal capacity in a number of high-profile bodies focused chiefly on various aspects of regional and international security: 1991 –Deputy Chief Inspector for biological weapons of the United Nations Special Commission in Iraq (UNSCOM); 1995–1998 –Member of Council of Founders, Geneva Center for Security Policy; 1999–2003 Member of the Advisory Board on Disarmament Matters to the UN Secretary General (in 2003 –Chairman of the Board); 2000–2003 –Member, United Nations Monitoring, Verification and Inspection Commission (UNMOVIC) and 2003–2006, Member of the Board of Directors of Transatlantic Partners Against AIDS.
Kostyantyn Gryshchenko holds the diplomatic rank of Ambassador Extraordinary and Plenipotentiary.

Education 
In 1975 Kostyantyn Gryshchenko graduated with honors from Moscow State Institute of International Relations with a specialty in international law. Besides his native Ukrainian and Russian languages he is fluent in English and French.

Professional activity 
1976–1980 –served as staff member of the United Nations Secretariat in New York City.

1981–1991 –held various diplomatic positions in the Ministry of Foreign Affairs of the USSR.

Following the collapse of the Soviet Union Kostyantyn Gryshchenko returned to Kyiv where he took up work in the Ministry of Foreign Affairs of newly independent Ukraine.

1995–1998 –Deputy Minister of Foreign Affairs of Ukraine  with responsibilities covering arms control and disarmament, European security, the Commonwealth of Independent States, Russian Federation, Middle East, Asia, Africa and the Pacific region. He played a key role in negotiating a number of crucial international agreements aimed at strengthening the independence, territorial integrity and security of Ukraine. During this time Kostyantyn Gryshchenko initiated a large scale program for professional diplomatic training for newly recruited MFA personnel in a number of the EU countries and in the United States. Many of the graduates later became leading diplomats in the Ukrainian diplomatic service.

1998–2000 – Head of Mission of Ukraine to NATO, Ambassador of Ukraine to Belgium, the Netherlands and Luxembourg, Permanent Representative to the Organization for the Prohibition of Chemical Weapons (OPCW) in The Hague.

2000–2003 – Ambassador of Ukraine to the United States and in 2001 non-resident Ambassador to Antigua and Barbuda.

2003–2005 – Minister of Foreign Affairs of Ukraine.

His policy priorities as Foreign Minister were European integration, strengthening ties with Washington and enhancing pragmatic cooperation with Russia. In 2003 he publicly opposed joining the Common Economic Space with Russia, Kazakhstan and Belarus. He, along with other members of the Cabinet, argued that membership in this institution would contradict the Ukrainian Constitution.
During the Ukrainian-Russian Tuzla crisis in 2003 he engaged all diplomatic tools at his disposal to counter Moscow's attempts to challenge Ukraine's territorial integrity and return to normal relations with Russian Federation.

2006–2007 –Foreign Policy Adviser to Prime Minister of Ukraine.

After snap parliamentary elections in 2007 Kostyantyn Gryshchenko joined the Opposition Government as a shadow Minister of Foreign Affairs.

With deepening political crisis in the Ukrainian-Russian relations President Victor Yushchenko in April 2008 appointed Kostyantyn Gryshchenko First Deputy Secretary of Ukraine's National Security and Defense Council(NSDC) and in July – Ambassador to the Russian Federation. Kostyantyn Gryshchenko continued serving as First Deputy Secretary of the NSDC giving Ukraine's Ambassador to Russia a special status that signaled the concern of the senior leadership over Ukrainian-Russian relations.

The main credo of the Ukrainian Ambassador in Moscow was expressed in his program article "Ukraine–Russia: the person and the state" in the Ukrainian weekly magazine "Zerkalo Nedeli":
"…the source of many conflicts and contradictions in the Ukrainian-Russian relationshipis rooted in one basic fact: in the years after collapse of the USSR, while sharing many common interests, we drifted apart on how we perceive our future social development and our values. Acceptance of these objective differences has to hold both Moscow and Kyiv and prevent us from attempts to teach each other, and to impose on our neighbor our own model as only true one".

During a TV duel with Dmitry Rogozin (then Russian Ambassador to NATO) Kostyantyn Gryshchenko stated that in Russia unacceptable ideology for developing normal Ukrainian-Russian relations is being imposed on society. He insisted that contentious issues need to be discussed in order to be resolved and thereafter agreements have to be consistently implemented, rather than aggravating them thus creating basis for future conflicts. As to the prospect of Ukraine's accession to NATO he replied that there is no realistic chance of it happening in foreseeable future, but, in any case, the direction of foreign policy of Ukraine will be decided only by the Ukrainian people and not by Moscow, Washington or Brussels.

After the presidential election in 2010 KostyantynGryshchenko was appointed Minister of Foreign Affairs for the second time.

In spring 2010 the newly appointed foreign minister embarked on a challenging mission to calm increasingly tense relations between Kyiv and Moscow. He pursued pragmatic policy course focusing on areas where cooperation would yield better results for both parties than conflict. With this approach Ukrainian exports to Russia almost doubled, a long-delayed demarcation of the land border between the two countries was implemented. By mitigating tensions between the two neighbors the Foreign Ministry eased administrative and police pressure on millions of Ukrainians in Russia. The détente in relations with Russia made it possible to persuade cautious Europeans to move forward with an ambitious Association Agreement with Ukraine.

The lifting of travel barriers for Ukrainian citizens was another priority. Under Kostyantyn Gryshchenko's guidance Ukrainian diplomats managed to negotiate visa free travel regimes with Israel, Turkey, Brazil, Argentina.

Kostyantyn Gryshchenko articulated Ukraine's foreign policy at the time as follows:
"Ukraine’s European policy has to be the priority, but has to be pragmatic. We need to understand that Ukraine undoubtedly has a European vocation, but in the current international reality Ukraine –in order to reach this goal –will have to steer its way forward quite differently from the new EU member states. It will be a path of internal transformation consistent with the European norms, in strategic partnership with the European Union and Russia, but also through development of cooperation with the regions of the world where we see dynamic economic development,a proactive desire to cooperate with Ukraine and respect for our national aspirations".

Among his main achievements during this period were the completion of negotiations of the Association Agreement with the EU in 2012 and finalization of the plan for a visa-free regime with the EU. Economic diplomacy was given a special priority. Formerly separate and inefficient trade missions were fully integrated into embassies and newly established Council of exporters established under the MFA auspices started to play an important role of promoter for Ukrainian goods and companies in international markets.

In December 2012 Kostyantyn Gryshchenko was named Vice Prime Minister of Ukraine by Viktor Yanukovych and became the first Foreign Minister in Ukraine's history tapped to leverage his international experience to address domestic social issues. His portfolio included science and education, health care, culture, youth and sports.

Among his priorities were strengthening of drug quality oversight (EU medicine standards were implemented in 2013 for circulation of medicines good manufacturing practice (GMP) and appropriate practice of distribution (GDP) of drugs). Ukraine became the first country to ratify the Convention of the Council of Europe on counteraction of falsification of medicines and similar crimes which bear threat to public health –the Medicrime Convention and the first post-Soviet state to introduce criminal liability for falsification of drugs. Serious steps were taken to simplify access to anesthetizing medicines for terminal patients. Priority attention was paid to improve availability of medical care (development of a network of institutions of primary link and reforming system of emergency medicine), as well as adoption of the draft of Nationwide target social program of counteraction to HIV/AIDS for 2014–2018.

As Vice Prime Minister, though not directly responsible for foreign policy, Kostyantyn Gryshchenko was on a number of occasions called upon to help Ukrainian citizens in distress. In July 2013 on a challenging mission to Tripoli, Libya he secured release of 19 Ukrainians held hostage by anti-government armed militia in the port of Benghazi.

He was dismissed from his position as member of the Cabinet of Ministers of Ukraine on 27 February 2014 by decree of the Verkhovna Rada of Ukraine.

Awards and honors
Kostyantyn Gryshchenko was awarded the Order of Merit (third, second and first class) for personal valuable contributions to diplomacy and foreign affairs in Ukraine, and also received Honorary Diplomas of the Cabinet of Ministers of Ukraine (2001, 2003), and VerkhovnaRada of Ukraine. He was awarded National Order of the Legion of Honour and also received a number of decorations from other foreign states.

Personal life
Kostyantyn Gryshchenko married Natalia Gryshchenko in 1974. They have a daughter, Oksana, and two grandchildren.

Notes

References

External links 

Living people
1953 births
Ambassadors of Ukraine to Russia
Foreign ministers of Ukraine
Ambassadors of Ukraine to the United States
Politicians from Kyiv
Republican Party of Ukraine politicians
Moscow State Institute of International Relations alumni
Ambassadors of Ukraine to Belgium
Ambassadors of Ukraine to the Netherlands
Heads of mission of Ukraine to NATO
Diplomats from Kyiv
Soviet diplomats
2003 Tuzla Island conflict
Ambassadors of Ukraine to Antigua and Barbuda
Vice Prime Ministers of Ukraine on humanitarian policy